Streptomyces alkaliterrae is a bacterium species from the genus Streptomyces which has been isolated from alkaline soil.

See also 
 List of Streptomyces species

References 

alkaliterrae
Bacteria described in 2020